The Golden Submarine was an early twentieth century streamlined race car designed and built in 1917 by Fred Offenhauser and Harry A. Miller for Barney Oldfield. AutoWeek said that the vehicle brought Miller "nationwide prominence as a race-car builder".

Background
Oldfield worked with Miller, who developed and built carburetors in Los Angeles, to create a racing machine that would not only be fast and durable, but that would also protect the driver in the event of an accident. Bob Burman, one of Oldfield's top rivals and closest friends, was killed in a wreck during a race in Corona, California. Burman died from severe injuries suffered while rolling over in his open-cockpit car. Oldfield and Miller joined forces to build a race car that incorporated an enclosed roll cage inside a streamlined driver's compartment to completely enclose the driver.

Construction
The Golden Submarine was built from aluminum with holes for the driver to look out. The gold color was achieved with a combination of bronze dust and lacquer.  The car cost $US 15,000 to build ($ in ).

Specifications
Its body and chassis were wind tunnel-tested aluminum body with rollover protection.

Race history
The car made its first outing on 16 June 1917 at the Chicago Board Speedway in Maywood, Illinois. The engine failed after , but it averaged  up to that point. The engine problems were ironed out the following week and on 25 June he defeated arch-rival Ralph DePalma three times on the Milwaukee dirt track. The car competed in 54 races with 20 wins, 2 seconds, and 2 thirds. The car qualified for the 1919 Indianapolis 500 but it dropped out after its engine failed.

References

Racing cars
American Championship racing cars